Alexander McGregor may refer to:
 Alexander McGregor (New Zealand politician)
 Alexander McGregor (Canadian politician)

See also
 Alex McGregor (disambiguation)